Swing in the Saddle is a 1944 American Western musical comedy film directed by Lew Landers and starring Jane Frazee.

Cast
 Jane Frazee as Penny Morrow
 Guinn Williams as "Tiny" Baldwin
 Slim Summerville as Northup "Slim" Bayliss
 Sally Bliss as Judy Bayliss
 Byron Foulger as Sheriff Mort Tucker
 Mary Treen as Addie LaTour
 Red River Dave as Steve Barrett
 Carole Mathews as Doreen Nesbitt
 Hoosier Hot Shots as Musicians/Ranch Hands
 The King Cole Trio as Musicians
 Jimmy Wakely and His Oklahoma Cowboys as Musicians
 Cousin Emmy as Cousin Emmy

External links
 

1944 films
1944 romantic comedy films
1940s Western (genre) comedy films
1940s Western (genre) musical films
1940s romantic musical films
American Western (genre) comedy films
American Western (genre) musical films
American black-and-white films
American romantic musical films
Columbia Pictures films
Films directed by Lew Landers
1940s English-language films
1940s American films